The Donaldson ministry was the first ministry of the Colony of New South Wales, and was led by Stuart Donaldson. Despite the first free elections for the New South Wales Legislative Assembly being held in March 1856, it took over two months for Donaldson to form Government. It was sworn in on 6 June 1856, after the 1856 election and lasted just eighty days.

The title of Premier was widely used to refer to the Leader of Government, but not enshrined in formal use until 1920.

There was no party system in New South Wales politics until 1887. Under the constitution, ministers were required to resign to recontest their seats in a by-election when appointed. Stuart Donaldson comfortably won the by election for Sydney Hamlets, and John Darvall comfortably won the by-election for Cumberland North Riding. Thomas Holt (Stanley Boroughs) and Bob Nichols (Northumberland Boroughs) were re-elected unopposed. William Manning was not required to resign as he held the office of Solicitor-General at the time of his election.

This ministry covers the period from 6 June 1856 until on 25 August 1856, when Donaldson resigned his commission, having lost the confidence of the Assembly.

Composition of ministry

 
Ministers are members of the Legislative Assembly unless otherwise noted.

See also

Self-government in New South Wales
Members of the New South Wales Legislative Assembly, 1856–1858

References

 

New South Wales ministries
1856 establishments in Australia
1856 disestablishments in Australia